Cedartown, Georgia is an album by American country music artist Waylon Jennings, released in 1971 on RCA Nashville.

Background
Jennings' second release of 1971 finds the singer moving further away from the Nashville Sound that had dominated his early albums at RCA.  Its title track, a morbid tale of murder, reached #14 on the country singles chart, and the LP also contains "It's All Over Now," written by Waylon's wife Jessi Colter, who duets with Jennings on Paul Simon's "Bridge Over Troubled Water" and also appears on the album cover with him.  Like most country albums during this period, Cedartown, Georgia contains songs that were recorded during numerous sessions that stretched back over periods of months and even years, depriving the album of any sense of continuity.  As Michael Striessguth's laments in his book Outlaw: Waylon, Willie, Kris, and the Renegades of Nashville, "Because RCA-Nashville failed to embrace the idea of the concept album, it happily dropped unreleased scraps from earlier sessions into those collections, spoiling any semblance of cohesion that they might have had."  In his autobiography Jennings wrote, "They always needed a marketing plan...Music is just music, and people who put labels on music are those who have to merchandize it.  It makes their job a lot easier.  I wanted to cut my records a whole different way; I wanted to build the song in the studio, not in the control room.  I wanted the dynamics to happen out there with the band."

Reception
The album peaked at #27 on the Billboard country albums chart, his fourth LP in a row that failed to crack the Top 10.  At the time of its release, however, the LP got an unexpected rave from Rolling Stone, which enthused, "It's this album that Waylon goes after everybody (including your mother) and intends to bring everybody over to his side.  It's all Dynamite stuff...Word is that if Waylon Jennings isn't already a country superstar, he soon will be."  Thom Jurek of AllMusic praises Jennings' performances but disparages the production of Danny Davis:  "The window dressing added by Davis waters down its impact and makes Jennings' job as a singer more difficult... Cedartown, Georgia feels just like what it is, a decent collection of songs and inspired performances marred by production nonsense.  Indeed, a quick listen to the album and it becomes difficult to see why Davis worked with Jennings at all."

Track listing
 "Cedartown, Georgia" (Mack Vickery, Sammi Smith, Charlie Cobble) – 2:48
 "Big D" (Jan Crutchfield) – 2:29
 "The House Song" (Paul Stookey, Robert Bannard) – 3:29
 "Tomorrow Night in Baltimore" (Kenny Price) – 3:03
 "Pickin' White Gold" (Fred Carter) – 2:34
 "Bridge Over Troubled Water" (Paul Simon) – 3:56 with Jessi Colter
 "It's All Over Now" (Jessi Colter) – 2:32
 "I'm Gonna Leave (While I Still Love You)" (Martha Sharp) – 3:05
 "I've Got Eyes for You" (Del Shannon, Brian Hyland) – 2:35
 "Let Me Stay Awhile" (Mickey Newbury) – 2:22

References

1971 albums
Waylon Jennings albums
RCA Records albums
Murder ballads